The Springfield Model 1882 Short Rifle was a trapdoor rifle based on the design of the Springfield Model 1873. It is usually referred to as a "short rifle" but is sometimes called a "carbine".

History and Design
The Model 1882 was an experiment by Springfield Armory. Its main goal was to combine the carbine and rifle into a single arm which they called the "short rifle" (a concept which the U.S. Army would not accept until the adoption of the M1903 Springfield). It was hoped that this one single arm could then supply the needs of the infantry, cavalry, and artillery.

The rifle was produced with a 28-inch barrel. Two versions were made, one with a full stock and a cleaning rod like the standard rifle, and another with a triangular ramrod bayonet similar to the one that had been used on the Springfield Model 1880. Only 26 of each type were manufactured.

The rifle was sent out for field trials in the spring of 1882. The rifle failed to impress military commanders, and was not seen as an improvement on existing arms. Development of a single rifle for infantry, cavalry, and artillery would continue in the Springfield Model 1886 Carbine.

See also
 Springfield rifle

References

Early rifles
Rifles of the United States
Hinged breechblock rifles
Springfield firearms